Michael B. Paulkovich is columnist for American Atheist Magazine, a print and online resource for atheism, religion and politics. He is also
a frequent contributor to Free Inquiry and contributing editor for The American Rationalist. Paulkovich is an inventor, editor, and space systems engineer for NASA.

Early life 
Paulkovich was born in Washington, DC and grew up in Montgomery County, Maryland. He completed his Bachelor of Science in Engineering at the University
of Maryland. While in college, Paulkovich developed his first invention, the melodic telephone ringer and published it in Popular Electronics.

Career 
While at NASA he contributed to the Cassini–Huygens mission, the CONTOUR spacecraft, and development of the James Webb Space Telescope. In 2011 he was asked to be columnist for American Atheist Magazine, and then contributing editor for The American Rationalist. He has written for Humanist Perspectives magazine, Popular Electronics
, Journal of Applied Fire Science, and  Science.

Inventions
Fire extinguishing system for large structures, U.S. pat. no. 7,048,068,
Asset protection system and method, US pat. appl. 20080074262
Laser sight, US pat. appl. 20050086847
Melodic Telephone Ringer
Robotic Lawn Mower

Books
God and Horrendous Suffering (co-author) (Denver: GCRR Press, 2021)
Mostly Harmful: 1001 Things Everyone Should Know About Religion (Annapolis: Spillix, 2020)
Beyond the Crusades: Christianity's Lies, Laws and Legacy with foreword by Robert M. Price (Cranford: American Atheist Press, 2016) 
 Filling the Void: A Selection of Humanist and Atheist Poetry (co-author) (Onus Books, 2016)
No Meek Messiah (Annapolis: Spillix, 2012)

Controversies
Candida Moss joined with Joel Baden to write an article in the Daily Beast about Paulkovich's No Meek Messiah book, but other writers have pointed out that their article has many errors: the claim that Paulkovich had no web presence, and no Twitter account, that he claimed to be a “Bible Scholar” and that there is no biographical information on him.

It has been suggested that Moss and Baden never had Paulkovich’s book in their possession; one writer asked, "Did anyone who wrote about No Meek Messiah ever read it? I don’t think so. Or if they did they hid their guilt well from the public."

In their Daily Beast article, Moss and Baden suggested that consuls, generals, kings and emperors do not write, yet Moss and Baden seem unaware of Paulkovich’s appendix citing many who were prolific authors (e.g. Moss and Baden mention Vardanes and Tiberius; Paulkovich cited the publications of those men in his appendix on pages 347 and 348 of No Meek Messiah.) Moss and Baden also claimed that one of the 126 sources Paulkovich cited who should have written about Jesus (Asclepiades) actually lived 100 years before Jesus, but they referenced the wrong Asclepiades (even linking to the wrong man at Wikipedia from their Daily Beast article), seemingly unaware of Paulkovich’s references and appendix – there were over 40 men of that name in ancient Prusa, Bithynia and Paulkovich referred to the Asclepiades who lived during Hadrian, late first century. 

Other writers who read the Moss/Baden article but apparently had never read No Meek Messiah, yet published their own reviews are:
 Billy Hallowell in The Blaze 
 Erick Erickson in The Resurgent
 James McGrath in Patheos
 Carey Lodge in Christian Today
 Ken Gilmore in BEREA
 Amanda Casanova in Religion Today
 Brian Mattson in a YouTube video

Michael Sherlock, now executive director of Atheist Alliance International also critiqued Paulkovich's work, writing that Paulkovich "made a fundamental mistake with regards to the alleged reference to Jesus in one of Josephus’ works" but later admitted his error, and that he had never read Paulkovich's work; he published an apology stating "the error rests with the sloppy journalism of Jonathan Vankin and not with the precise research of Michael Paulkovich."

See also
American Rationalist
American Atheist Magazine
Free Inquiry magazine
Christ myth theory
Historicity of Jesus
September 11 attacks
National Fire Protection Association
Journal of Fire Sciences

References

External links
Council for Secular Humanism
Journal of Applied Fire Science
Beyond the Crusades
Beyond the Crusades reviews
No Meek Messiah

Irreligion in the United States
Living people
American engineers
American humanists
American inventors
Writers from Maryland
University of Maryland, College Park alumni
American non-fiction writers
20th-century American writers
21st-century American writers
Christ myth theory proponents
1955 births
Freethought writers
Writers about religion and science
American atheism activists